Oakdale Historic District is a national historic district located at Fort Wayne, Indiana.  The district encompasses 334 contributing buildings and 38 contributing objects in a predominantly residential section of Fort Wayne. The area was developed between about 1915 and 1930, and includes notable examples of Colonial Revival, American Four Square, and Bungalow / American Craftsman style residential architecture.  The contributing objects are entry markers and streetlamps.

It was listed on the National Register of Historic Places in 2000.

References

Houses on the National Register of Historic Places in Indiana
Historic districts on the National Register of Historic Places in Indiana
Colonial Revival architecture in Indiana
National Register of Historic Places in Fort Wayne, Indiana
Houses in Fort Wayne, Indiana